Popeseye steak is thinly sliced rump steak, originating in Scotland.

Etymology 

The etymology of the term "popeseye steak" is twofold:
 It is possibly from pope's eye, "the gland surrounded with fat in the middle of the thigh of an ox or a sheep".
 The base steak from which the popeseye steak is cut is the Rump steak or Round Steak, which consists of the "eye round, bottom round, and top round still connected together".

Butchery 
One first begins with a cut of rump steak. Then, thinly slice the rump steak across the widest face of the rump steak (shown as the top of the steak in the illustration). Slice width varies; one Scotch Beef butcher sells slices that "typically weigh around 6oz" each.

Characteristics 
Popeseye steak is very tender, and, due to its relative thinness compared to other steaks, cooks quickly, particularly if used as a pan frying steak. Cooking of this cut should stop as soon as it is brown on each side.

Food preparation 
These steaks can be enjoyed as follows:
 In place of other types of beef steaks that are braised, grilled, fondued or pan fried
 As a casserole
 As one savoury ingredient in a meat pie

See also

 Cut of beef
 List of steak dishes

References

Scottish cuisine
Cuts of beef